
The Schwarzsee (German for "Black Lake") is a small lake near Zermatt in the canton of Valais, Switzerland.

Its surface area is 0.5 ha. A chapel dedicated to Mary of the Snows – the chapel Maria zum Schnee – lies on the edge of the lake.

It can be reached by cable car from Zermatt.

Lakes of Valais
Ridges of Europe